Earl Carter may refer to:

Given name and surname
 Buddy Carter (Earl Leroy "Buddy" Carter; born 1957), American politician; U.S. Representative from Georgia
 E. N. J. Carter, American novelist and advertising copywriter

Middle name and surname
 Jimmy Carter (James Earl Carter Jr.; born 1924); American politician and philanthropist; 39th president of the United States (1977–1981)
 James Earl Carter Sr. (1894–1953); American politician, businessman, and farmer; father of Jimmy Carter
 Asa Earl Carter (1925–1979), 1950s Ku Klux Klan leader, segregationist speechwriter, and Western novelist
 Rod Carter (American football) (Roderick Earl Carter; born 1966); former American football linebacker
 Robert Carter (priest) (Robert Earl Carter; 1927–2010); American Roman Catholic priest and LGBT rights activist